Marin Medak (born 1987) is a Slovenian adventurer.

Medak is one of the youngest ocean rowing expedition leader and the first Slovenian to row across the Atlantic Ocean.

Medak lives in Piran and is a student at the Faculty of electrical engineering on the University of Ljubljana. He started sea kayaking in early 2009 and after four months departed for his first solo sea kayaking adventure. He paddled the islands of Dalmatia (Croatia), starting at Lošinj (Croatia)and finishing in Zadar (Croatia).

A year after he kayaked solo 1400 km from Savudrija (Croatia) to the Island of Zakynthos (Greece).

In 2011, he persuaded experienced sea kayaker Simon Osborne (UK) to come with him to South Korea. In March 2011, after 23 days of temperature around or below freezing, the duo become the first to successfully paddle the length of the coast of South Korea.
In the same year Medak and his Paralympian friend Gal Jakič try to set a speed record for kayaking the coast of Croatia, but had to abort the expedition due to medical problems.

After three years of adventures around the world it was time for Medak to live his dreams and row across the Atlantic ocean. In early 2012 he successfully skippered a four-man Slovenian-British Ocean Rowing expedition Tušmobil TransAtlantik. He was joined by three UK rowers, Simon Osborne, Stephen Bowens and Alastair Humphreys.

Medak is supporting and raising funds for Društvo KROS, a charity organization that helps with children rehabilitation after neural injuries.

After his extreme expeditions, Medak ventured into entrepreneurship.

In April 2013 he launched a keyring brand, Hobkey, with keyrings for sea and whitewater kayakers, scuba divers and canoeists. 
At the end of 2013 Medak and Gigodesign, an award-winning design studio from Ljubljana, Slovenia, partnered to make the smallest iPhone charger on the go. After a year of work they launched  Oivo, a charger that uses AA batteries to power the phone and small enough to fit as a keyring.

Oivo was launched on Kickstarter in September 2014. 
In 18 days they raised more than $26,000, but the team decided to cancel the campaign due to too many mistakes made in the go-to-market phase.
They tried to sell the whole product, but were unsuccessful. The project was abandoned in November 2014.

In January 2015 Marin joined forces with an Australian adventurer, Huw Kingston, to become the first to row the Eastern Mediterranean from Tunisia to Turkey.
They started in Hammamet stopped in Malta, Foinikounta, Monemvasia and finished 1750 kilometers and 49 days later in Çeşme.
For the last two legs, Dimitris Kokkoris  joined the expedition. 
Due to delays by unfavorable winds, Huw had to skip the last let and end his rowing leg earlier, to continue his bigger expedition Mediterr Année.

Expeditions

References

External links
Slovenian-British Ocean Rowing Expedition Transatlantic 2012
Marin Medak webpage
South Korea expedition 2011 webpage
Australian-Slovenian Rowing Expedition Eastern Mediterranean
Mediterr Année

1987 births
Slovenian male rowers
Living people
University of Ljubljana alumni
People from Piran
Ocean rowers
21st-century Slovenian people